John Ernest Dolibois (né Jean Ernst Dolibois; December 4, 1918 – May 2, 2014) was a United States Ambassador to Luxembourg and college administrator.

A native of Bonnevoie, Luxembourg, Dolibois emigrated to the United States with his father in 1931.  He graduated from Miami University, where he was a member of Beta Theta Pi, and served in the United States Army during World War II. 
He was a member of the so-called Ritchie Boys, a special military intelligence unit composed mainly of German, Austrian, and Czech refugees and immigrants to the United States. He used to teach German order of battle and Nazi Party hierarchy to army officers preparing to go off to war. He was an interrogator during the Nuremberg trials and became acquainted with many of the most significant Nazi war criminals. He was sent to Luxembourg to interrogate the highest ranking war criminals in Nazi Party. After a brief career with the Procter and Gamble Company, he returned to Miami as alumni secretary, eventually becoming Vice President. He was instrumental in the development of the Miami University Dolibois European Center in Luxembourg which is named in his honor.

Dolibois was a frequent speaker to students and other groups about his experiences during the Nuremberg trials.

In 1989, his autobiography, Pattern of Circles. An Ambassador's Story, was published by Kent State University Press.

Dolibois died on May 2, 2014, in Cincinnati, Ohio, at the age of 95.

See also
 Camp Ashcan
 Miami University Dolibois European Center

References

External links

1918 births
2014 deaths
Ambassadors of the United States to Luxembourg
Miami University alumni
Luxembourgian emigrants to the United States
United States Army officers
United States Army personnel of World War II
Ritchie Boys
20th-century American diplomats